Hans Joachim Schaufuß (transliterated: Schaufuss) (28 December 1918 – 27 October 1941) was a German actor. Schaufuß began as a child actor, appearing in Emil and the Detectives (1931) and The White Demon (1932). From the mid-1930s he began to appear in more mature roles. He was killed in Oryol in the Soviet Union while serving on the Eastern Front during the Second World War.

Biography
Schaufuß was the son of stage and film actor Hans Hermann Schaufuß and the older brother of actor Peter-Timm Schaufuß. Following his role in Emil and the Detectives, from the mid-1930s he began to appear in more mature film roles.

Schaufuß would be one of three young actors from Emil and the Detectives to be killed while serving in the military in World War II. Co-stars Rolf Wenkhaus would be killed in action at age 24 in January 1942 off the coast of Ireland with an aircrew that specialized in attacking Allied shipping and Hans Albrecht Löhr would be killed in action at age 21 in August 1942 on the Eastern Front.

Selected filmography
 Emil and the Detectives (1931)
 The White Demon (1932)
 The Burning Secret (1933)
 The Tsarevich (1933)
 Gretel Wins First Prize (1933)
 Annette in Paradise (1934)
 Game on Board (1936)
 Stjenka Rasin (1936)
 The Beggar Student (1936)
 The Dreamer (1936)

References

External links

Bibliography 
 Youngkin, Stephen.  The Lost One: A Life of Peter Lorre. University Press of Kentucky, 2005.

1918 births
1941 deaths
German male film actors
Male actors from Hamburg
German male child actors
German military personnel killed in World War II
20th-century German male actors
German Army personnel of World War II